Kopachyovo is a rural locality (a village) in Matigorskoye Rural Settlement of Kholmogorsky District, Arkhangelsk Oblast, Russia. The population was 233 as of 2010.

Geography 
Kopachyovo is located 38 km south of Kholmogory (the district's administrative centre) by road. Pyatkovo is the nearest rural locality.

References 

Rural localities in Kholmogorsky District